Jermaine Lamont Allensworth (born January 11, 1972) is an American former professional baseball outfielder. He played four seasons in Major League Baseball (MLB), from 1996 until 1999, for the Pittsburgh Pirates, Kansas City Royals and the New York Mets.

Career
Allensworth was the California Angels' 15th round selection and 422nd overall selection of the 1990 MLB draft, but did not sign with them. He instead played college baseball for the Purdue Boilermakers. Allensworth was talked into attending Purdue by Troy Lewis. In 1992, he played collegiate summer baseball with the Cotuit Kettleers of the Cape Cod Baseball League and was named a league all-star. He was a Big Ten Conference All-Star in 1993. He was drafted 34th overall by the Pittsburgh Pirates that year, with whom he signed.

He was an All-Star in the Pacific Coast League in 1996, leading to a promotion to the MLB, where he batted .262 in 61 games with the Pirates. He played two more seasons with the Pirates before being traded to the Kansas City Royals, then sent to the New York Mets, where he finished his career.

After his MLB career, Allensworth continued to play in the minor leagues. After being released by the Atlanta Braves following the 2002 season, he spent a year away from professional baseball. In 2004, he joined the independent Northern League, where he played for five seasons, most recently for the Schaumburg Flyers in 2008.  In 2007, he led the Gary SouthShore RailCats to the League Championship.

Allensworth was portrayed by Tracy Morgan in a sketch on a 1997 episode of Saturday Night Live.

Notes

External links 

1972 births
Living people
African-American baseball players
American expatriate baseball players in Canada
Baseball players from Indiana
Calgary Cannons players
Carolina Mudcats players
Cotuit Kettleers players
Gary SouthShore RailCats players
Greenville Braves players
Joliet JackHammers players
Kansas City Royals players
Major League Baseball center fielders
New York Mets players
Norfolk Tides players
Pittsburgh Pirates players
Purdue Boilermakers baseball players
Schaumburg Flyers players
Sportspeople from Anderson, Indiana
Toledo Mud Hens players
Welland Pirates players
21st-century African-American sportspeople
20th-century African-American sportspeople